The Church of St. John the Baptist at the Béguinage is a Roman Catholic parish church in central Brussels, Belgium. It is dedicated to Saint John the Baptist.

The original Gothic church was built at the end of 13th century, as part of the Notre-Dame de la Vigne beguinage. It was partially destroyed by calvinists in 1584 and rebuilt thereafter. Attributed to the Flemish architect Lucas Faydherbe, the reconstructed building, which still stands today, is a notable illustration of the Italian-influenced Flemish Baroque style of the 17th century. The complex was designated a historic monument in 1936.

The church is located on the /, not far from the Place de Brouckère/De Brouckèreplein, the / and the Grand Hospice Pachéco. This site is served by the metro stations De Brouckère and Sainte-Catherine/Sint-Katelijne on lines 1 and 5.

History

The beguines were lay women who lived a communal life but were not bound by perpetual vows.

Located near today's /, the community composed a miniature village of individual dwellings with a mill, laundry, and flower and vegetable garden enclosed within a wall. The beguines built an infirmary and a small chapel dedicated to Our Lady of the Vineyard served as a place of worship.

Because their community had grown to 1200 beguines at the end of the 13th century, a larger Gothic church was built at the same location where the present-day building is located. The women engaged in weaving wool, and from the 16th century onward, in making lace. From the start, the / ("Beguines Street") formed the main axis of this large triangular domain of which the / ("Laeken Street") formed the base. The area between the Rue de Laeken and the / was known as the Beguinage Quarter during the Middle Ages.

The beguines were dispersed in 1797 during the French regime. The grounds were parcelled out gradually and streets laid out. The infirmary was renovated and transformed into the Grand Hospice Pachéco.

The church was designated a historic monument on 5 March 1936. In 1998, the tragic expulsion of the Nigerian asylum seeker Semira Adamu, who died after police violence, triggered the occupation of the church from October 1998 to January 1999 by political refugee candidates awaiting regularisation.

Building
The previous church was a Gothic building with three naves and a transept that was destroyed by calvinists in 1584 during the Calvinist Republic of Brussels which lasted from 1577 to 1585. The beguines decided to rebuild their church in Baroque style and its construction started in 1657. Attributed to the Flemish architect Lucas Faydherbe, this church is a notable illustration of the Italian-influenced Flemish Baroque style of the 17th century. Its facade is considered to be one of the most beautiful in Belgium. The church was restored after a fire ravaged the roof in November 2000.

In popular culture

Filmography
 The church and the surrounding streets where prominently featured in the 2018 BBC television miniseries Les Misérables.

See also
 Beguines and Beghards
 List of churches in Brussels
 Roman Catholicism in Belgium
 History of Brussels

References

Notes

Bibliography

External links
 
 

Roman Catholic churches in Brussels
City of Brussels
Protected heritage sites in Brussels
Baroque architecture in Belgium
Churches completed in 1676
1676 establishments in the Holy Roman Empire